Rand Tower is a 26-story high rise hotel in Minneapolis, Minnesota, United States. It was one of the city's tallest structures when it was completed as an office building in 1929.

History 
The Rand Tower was designed by Holabird & Root for Rufus R. Rand, a World War I aviator who was part of the family that owned the Minneapolis Gas Company (Minnegasco), now part of CenterPoint Energy.  Rand had flown in the Lafayette Flying Corps during the war.  Much of the building is covered in Art Deco ornamentation that follows an aviation theme and there is a sculpture Wings in the lobby by Oskar J. W. Hansen. The original builder was C.F. Haglin & Sons.

A skyway was attached to the building in 1969. Rand Tower was added to the National Register of Historic Places in 1994. It was known for a time as the Dain Tower until Dain Rauscher relocated to the Dain Rauscher Plaza just down the street in 1992. It was purchased by Gaughan Companies in 2004. In 2008, Hempel Properties purchased the Rand Tower to house its headquarters. Maven Real Estate Partners purchased the building in 2017 for $18.7 million. Maven converted the office building into a 270-room hotel, at a cost $110 million. The Rand Tower Hotel opened on December 2, 2020, as part of the Tribute Portfolio division of Marriott.

See also
List of tallest buildings in Minneapolis

References

External links
Rand Tower Hotel official website
Rand Tower, Minneapolis, a Tribute Portfolio Hotel official website
Rand Tower
Rand Tower at Emporis.
Rand Tower tribute by James Lileks
Oskar J.W. Hansen
 Wings sculpture by Oskar J.W. Hansen 
Rand Tower entrance
Oskar J. W. Hansen (1892-1971) 
Rufus R. Rand
Rufus R. Rand at the Minnesota Aviation Hall Of Fame. Scroll down to bottom of page. 
Rand Mansion in Wayzata, Minnesota

Art Deco architecture in Minnesota
National Register of Historic Places in Minneapolis
Office buildings completed in 1929
Office buildings on the National Register of Historic Places in Minnesota
Projects by Holabird & Root
Skyscraper office buildings in Minneapolis
Hotels established in 2020
Hotel buildings completed in 1929